The 1975 British Grand Prix (formally the John Player Grand Prix) was a Formula One motor race held at Silverstone on 19 July 1975. It was race 10 of 14 in both the 1975 World Championship of Drivers and the 1975 International Cup for Formula One Manufacturers. It was the 30th British Grand Prix to be held since the race was first held in 1926 and the 17th time the race had been held at Silverstone. The race was held over 56 of the scheduled 67 laps of the four kilometre venue for a race distance of 264 kilometres.

The results were overshadowed by a heavy hail storm from Lap 53, which caused three out of the top four cars (Jody Scheckter, James Hunt, and Mark Donohue), to aquaplane and crash in the same corner, bringing an early finish to the race, and a significant absence on the podium. A number of other cars crashed at the same corner as well, including Wilson Fittipaldi, Jochen Mass, and John Watson. The race results were finalised the lap after the lap most cars crashed, giving Brazilian Emerson Fittipaldi, who had been the race leader prior to the storm, a one lap win in his McLaren M23. Carlos Pace, who was one of the crashers in his Brabham BT44B was classified in second position with another of the crashers, Tyrrell 007 driver Jody Scheckter classified third.

Race summary 

A new chicane had been installed at Woodcote Corner, bringing complaints from the purists but also arguments that it was necessary in the interests of safety. Tom Pryce gained his only career pole position in his home race, whilst the Ferraris were on the second row, with James Hunt languishing on the fifth row.

Graham Hill announced his retirement as a driver after 17 seasons and 176 races to concentrate on his Embassy Hill team.

From the start – in which a lights system was being used for the first time in any Grand Prix, replacing the traditional national flag – Carlos Pace led from Pryce.

Following the hail storm, only six cars were running at the end. The RAC declared the race finished officially on the lap after the lap when most cars were running – lap 56. Ferrari, with both of their cars stuck on lap 54 in the classification protested, but the RAC threw these protests out and three days later, the provisional results were confirmed.

The win was the 14th and final win of Fittipaldi's career which had included two world championships. He would continue racing in Formula One until 1980. The win also vaulted Fittipaldi past Carlos Reutemann into second place in the championship, 14 points behind Lauda.

Classification

Qualifying classification 

*Positions in red indicate entries that failed to qualify.

Race classification

Championship standings after the race

Drivers' Championship standings

Constructors' Championship standings

References

British Grand Prix
British Grand Prix
Grand Prix